The Cabinet Secretary for Net Zero, Energy and Transport is a position in the Scottish Government Cabinet. The Cabinet Secretary has responsibilities for infrastructure, transport and energy. The Cabinet Secretary is assisted by the Minister for Transport, Minister for Environment, Biodiversity and Land Reform and Minister for Just Transition, Employment and Fair Work.

The current Cabinet Secretary is Michael Matheson, who was appointed in June 2018.

Overview

Responsibilities
The responsibilities of the Cabinet Secretary for Net Zero, Energy and Transport include:
Transport and public transport
Infrastructure investment policy
Cities & City Deals
Town centres
Energy and energy consents
Renewable energy industries
Connectivity, including 100% broadband
Cross government co-ordination on islands.

Public bodies
The following public bodies report to the Cabinet Secretary for Net Zero, Energy and Transport:
 Transport Scotland

List of office holders

References

External links
The Scottish Cabinet

Transport, Infrastructure and Connectivity
Transport in Scotland
Infrastructure in the United Kingdom
2018 establishments in Scotland